Jocelyne Villeneuve Ouellette (April 6, 1944 – August 20, 2015) was a Canadian politician, who represented the electoral district of Hull in the National Assembly of Quebec from 1976 to 1981. She served as the Minister of Public Works and Supply in the government of René Lévesque.

She was a member of the Parti Québécois.

References

1944 births
2015 deaths
Parti Québécois MNAs
Politicians from Gatineau
Women MNAs in Quebec
French Quebecers
Members of the Executive Council of Quebec